Vermont Route 113 (VT 113) is a  east–west state highway in eastern Vermont in the United States. It runs south and east from an intersection with VT 110 in Chelsea to the New Hampshire border in Thetford. VT 113 crosses the Connecticut River, becoming East Thetford Road, an unnumbered local road in the town of Lyme, New Hampshire which connects to New Hampshire Route 10.

Route description
Route 113 begins in the west at an intersection with Route 110 in the town of Chelsea. Route 113 begins its eastward journey proceeding out of Chelsea, passing into and through the town of Vershire, serving the town center. The highway takes a turn to the south towards the town of West Fairlee, where it intersects the western terminus of Route 244. Route 113 is signed as an east–west highway, but at this point is heading due south. It continues southward until crossing into the town of Thetford, where it begins to turn back to the east. Route 113 interchanges with Interstate 91 in the town, at Exit 14. The highway continues to the east, into the village of East Thetford, where it intersects U.S. Route 5 just west of the Connecticut River and the border with New Hampshire. Route 113 briefly overlaps US-5 (for about 30 yards), before turning east to cross the river.

Major intersections

References

External links

113
Transportation in Orange County, Vermont